Wierzbica Górna  (German: until 1911: Polnisch Würbitz, 1911–1936: Würbitz, 1936–1945: Oberweiden O.S.) is a village in the administrative district of Gmina Wołczyn, within Kluczbork County, Opole Voivodeship, in south-western Poland.

In the years 1945–1954 it was the seat of the rural administrative district of Wierzbica Górna.

In the years 1975–1998 it administratively belonged to the province of Opole.
  
Belonging to Wierzbica Górna are the rural hamlets Międzybrodzie and Leśnicówka (Wałda) along with settlements Cegielnia ('brickyard') and Kołaczek ('circular wedding bread').

For the history of the region, see Upper Silesia.

The village has a population of 1,141.

Name history

It also gives the name as  indicating that it was named according to Polish law.

The geographical Dictionary of the Kingdom of Poland issued at the turn of the 19th and 20th centuries has the name as Wierzbica Polska in Polish and Polnisch Wuerbitz in German. 

In 1911, when it was part of the German Empire, the rural community of Polnisch Würbitz was renamed Würbitz. On May 27, 1936, the name of the place was changed to Oberweiden O.S.

References

Villages in Kluczbork County